The East African armadillo  lizard, dwarf sungazer, or tropical girdled lizard (Cordylus tropidosternum) is a species of arboreal or rupicolous (rock-dwelling) lizard endemic to East Africa.

Habitat
The preferred habitat of the East African armadillo lizard is dry forests.

Geographic range
C. tropidosternum ranges from the southern Kenya through Tanzania and Malawi to southern Democratic Republic of the Congo, Zambia, northeast Zimbabwe and Mozambique.

Behavior
Dwarf sungazers are diurnal.  They lay down fat reserves in preparation for the dry season.

Description
Tropical girdled lizards are brown above with dark brown and cream spots or thin dark bands. A conspicuous black stripe runs along each side of the neck from the ear to the shoulder. The lips, throat, and belly are cream. The tail is very spiny. Males have slightly wider heads than females (The length of a male's head is about 1.25 times the width, whereas the length of a female's head is about 1.33 times the width.) and are aggressive toward other males of the same species. Both sexes have femoral pores.

Tropical girdled lizards are almost identical to the Limpopo girdled lizard (Cordylus jonesii) and the Ukinga girdled lizard (Cordylus ukingensis).  Limpopo girdled lizards have smooth scales on the throat and belly (C. tropidosternum has keeled scales) and its nostril is in the center of the nasal scale (the nostril of C. tropidosternum is positioned in the lower posterior corner of the nasal scale).  The Ukinga girdled lizard has distinctive white lips, a small ridge over each eye (supraocular ridge), and the loreal scale is fused with the preocular scale (they are separate in C. tropidosternum and C. jonesii ).

As pets
The tropical girdled lizard is exported from Tanzania and Mozambique for the pet trade where it is commonly referred to as the “armadillo lizard” or “forest armadillo lizard or “Jones's armadillo lizard”. Tropical girdled lizards are not flattened like the true armadillo Lizard (Ouroboros cataphractus) and do not grasp their tail and roll into a ball for defense. With gentle handling and plenty of hiding places, tropical girdled lizards become excellent, long-lived pets and can be trained to accept food from their owner’s hand.

Diet
As pets they are insectivores and can eat crickets, meal worms, phoenix worms, and occasionally wax worms.

Breeding
They give birth to 1-6 live young.

References

Further reading
Branch, Bill (1998).  Field Guide to Snakes and other Reptiles of Southern Africa. Third Revised edition. Sanibel Island, Florida: Ralph Curtis Books. 399 pp.
Broadley DG, Branch WR (2002).  "A review of the small east African Cordylus (Sauria: Cordylidae), with the description of a new species". African Journal of Herpetology 51(1): 9-34.
Cope ED (1869). "Seventh Contribution to the Herpetology of Tropical America". Proc. American Philosoph. Soc. 11: 147-169. (Zonurus tropidosternum, new species, p. 169).
Spawls S, Howell K, Drewes R, Ashe J (2002).  A Field Guide to the Reptiles of East Africa. San Diego: Academic Press. 543 pp.

Care Information

Cordylus
Lizards of Africa
Reptiles of the Democratic Republic of the Congo
Reptiles of Kenya
Reptiles of Malawi
Reptiles of Mozambique
Reptiles of Tanzania
Reptiles of Zambia
Reptiles of Zimbabwe
Reptiles described in 1869
Taxa named by Edward Drinker Cope